Helena is an unincorporated community and census-designated place (CDP) in Jackson County, Mississippi, United States. It is part of the Moss Point Metropolitan Statistical Area. Per the 2020 Census, the population was 983.

History
A post office operated under the name Helena from 1910 to 1924.

Geography
Helena is in eastern Jackson County, east of Escatawpa and north of Moss Point.

Demographics

2020 census

Note: the US Census treats Hispanic/Latino as an ethnic category. This table excludes Latinos from the racial categories and assigns them to a separate category. Hispanics/Latinos can be of any race.

2000 Census
As of the census of 2000, there were 778 people, 266 households, and 222 families residing in the CDP. The population density was 385.3 people per square mile (148.7/km2). There were 280 housing units at an average density of 138.7/sq mi (53.5/km2). The racial makeup of the CDP was 93.83% White, 5.14% African American, 0.39% Asian, 0.26% from other races, and 0.39% from two or more races. Hispanic or Latino of any race were 0.26% of the population.

There were 266 households, out of which 38.0% had children under the age of 18 living with them, 66.9% were married couples living together, 10.9% had a female householder with no husband present, and 16.5% were non-families. 14.3% of all households were made up of individuals, and 4.5% had someone living alone who was 65 years of age or older. The average household size was 2.92 and the average family size was 3.21.

In the CDP, the population was spread out, with 26.3% under the age of 18, 13.0% from 18 to 24, 26.9% from 25 to 44, 24.4% from 45 to 64, and 9.4% who were 65 years of age or older. The median age was 34 years. For every 100 females, there were 100.0 males. For every 100 females age 18 and over, there were 97.6 males.

The median income for a household in the CDP was $36,302, and the median income for a family was $36,302. Males had a median income of $31,588 versus $18,173 for females. The per capita income for the CDP was $12,346. About 6.2% of families and 5.2% of the population were below the poverty line, including 6.0% of those under age 18 and 17.9% of those age 65 or over.

Education
Helena is served by the Moss Point School District, and students attend schools in Moss Point, Mississippi.

Schools
 Moss Point High School
 Magnolia Middle School
 Escatawpa Upper Elementary School (grades 3-5)
 Kreole Primary School (grades K-2)

References

Census-designated places in Jackson County, Mississippi
Census-designated places in Mississippi
Pascagoula metropolitan area